Regent Hotels & Resorts is a British luxury hospitality brand, founded by hotelier Robert H. Burns in 1970. After passing through different owners since foundation, it is currently jointly owned by IHG Hotels & Resorts and Formosa International Hotels Corporation since July 2018, with hotels and resorts in Asia and Europe.

History
The brand was founded by hotelier Robert H. Burns as a joint venture with Japan's Tokyu Group in 1970, opening its first property in Waikiki Beach, Honolulu in 1971. Burns was, soon after, joined by George Rafael and Adrian Zecha, who together developed and expanded Regent's footprint to 17 hotels worldwide. In 1981, The Regent Hong Kong opened to great acclaim and was consistently labelled "the world's best hotel". The Regent Beverly Wilshire joined the chain in 1985, and later served as the setting for the 1990 film Pretty Woman, which helped cement Regent's reputation as a luxury hotel operator at the time.

In 1986, EIE International acquired a 35% stake. When Burns decided to sell his remaining 65% stake in 1992, EIE exercised its right of first refusal to acquire the entire company, which was then promptly sold to the Four Seasons hotel chain. Regent properties that were under development at the time of purchase in Bali, Milan, New York, and Istanbul were subsequently opened under the Four Seasons flag. Furthermore, Regent Hotels in Jakarta, Bangkok, Chiang Mai, Sydney, as well as the Beverly Wilshire were likewise absorbed into the Four Seasons chain.

In 1998, Carlson acquired the Regent name for new hotel developments and created a luxury hotel division while Four Seasons continued managing existing and new Regent hotels, thus labelling existing Regents as "a Four Seasons Hotel". In 2002, Carlson agreed with Rezidor SAS to develop the Regent hotel brand in Africa, Europe and the Middle East. Projects were announced in Kuwait, Qatar, the United Arab Emirates and Hungary, but none materialized under the Regent brand under Carlson's ownership.

In March 2006, Carlson renamed its Radisson Seven Seas Cruises as Regent Seven Seas Cruises and merged the cruise operation and Regent International Hotels under a common brand. In 2008, Regent Seven Seas Cruises was sold to Apollo Management, an investment company. Carlson retained ownership of the master Regent brand, along with the operations of Regent Hotels & Resorts around the world.

In 2010, Carlson sold the Regent business to Formosa International Hotels, the largest listed hotel operator in Taiwan and owner of Grand Formosa Regent Taipei hotel in Taipei, Taiwan, which was opened by Regent's founders in 1990 as The Regent Taipei. Co-founder Robert Burns was appointed Honorary Chairman, and Ralf Ohletz as president. Ohletz had worked with another Regent co-founder, Adrian Zecha, for 25 years.

In March 2018, IHG Hotels & Resorts (IHG) announced that it had agreed to buy a 51% majority stake in Regent Hotels for $39 million and planned to expand the brand's footprint to 40 hotels from the portfolio of six hotels at acquisition. This includes rebranding the iconic InterContinental Hong Kong, which initially opened as a Regent property in 1980, to a Regent property once again in 2022 following major renovations. As part of the acquisition deal, IHG has the right to acquire the remaining 49% of Regent in a phased manner from 2026. New properties have since been signed in Kuala Lumpur, Chengdu, Shanghai and Jeddah, with IHG planning a careful rollout of the brand to ensure its exclusivity at the top end of the hospitality market.

Since the acquisition of Regent by IHG, the brand logo, monogram and identity were changed in May 2019, where IHG has positioned the brand as its top end offering in the luxury hotel segment.

Current properties 

Europe
 Regent Berlin - opened in 1996 as Four Seasons Hotel Berlin, converted to Regent in 2004
 Regent Porto Montenegro - opened 2014
 Carlton Cannes, A Regent Hotel - opened in 1913 as the Carlton Hotel, operated as the Carlton InterContinental between 1982 and 2020, reopened as a Regent on March 13, 2023

Asia
 Regent Beijing - opened 2006
 Regent Chongqing - opened 2017
 Regent Phu Quoc - opened April 19, 2022
 Regent Shanghai Pudong - opened in 2012 as Four Seasons Hotel Shanghai at Pudong, converted to Regent in 2020
 Regent Taipei - opened 1990

Branded Residences
 Regent Residences Jakarta

Pipeline properties 
 Regent Hong Kong - reopening June 2023 
 Regent Bali Canggu - opening 2023
 Regent Santa Monica Beach - opening 2023
 Regent Shanghai on The Bund - opening 2023
 Regent Kyoto - opening 2024
 Regent Sanya Haitang Bay - opening 2026
 Regent Shenzhen Bay - opening 2028
 Regent Kuala Lumpur - opening TBD
 Regent Jeddah - opening TBD
 Regent Chengdu - opening TBD

Former properties 
US
 The Regent Beverly Wilshire, Beverly Hills, California - currently Beverly Wilshire Beverly Hills (A Four Seasons Hotel)
 Mark Hopkins Hotel, San Francisco - currently InterContinental Mark Hopkins San Francisco
 The Regent of Washington, D.C. - currently The Westin Georgetown, Washington, D.C.
 The Regent Bal Harbour, Miami - currently The Ritz-Carlton Bal Harbour
 The Regent South Beach, Miami - currently Z Ocean Hotel
 Halekulani, Honolulu, Hawaii - currently independent
 Hawaiian Regent Hotel, Honolulu, Hawaii - first hotel in the chain, opened 1971, currently Waikiki Beach Marriott Resort & Spa
 Kapalua Bay Hotel, Kapalua, Hawaii - currently independent
 The Mayfair Regent of Chicago - currently Mayfair Condominiums
 The Regent Las Vegas - currently JW Marriott Las Vegas
 The Regent of Albuquerque, New Mexico - currently DoubleTree by Hilton Hotel Albuquerque
 The Mayfair Regent of New York - currently 610 Park Avenue condominiums
 The Regent Wall Street - currently Cipriani Club Residences at 55 Wall Street

Canada
 Le Parc-Régent, Montreal, Quebec - currently McGill University New Residence Hall

Caribbean
 Cerromar Beach Hotel, Puerto Rico - later Hyatt Regency Cerromar Beach Resort, closed since 2003
 Dorado Beach Hotel, Puerto Rico - later Hyatt Dorado Beach, demolished to build Dorado Beach, a Ritz Carlton Reserve
 The Regent Palms Turks & Caicos - currently The Palms Turks & Caicos

Europe
 The Regent Esplanade Zagreb, Croatia - currently independent
 The Regent Grand Hotel Bordeaux, France - currently Inter-Continental Bordeaux Le Grand Hotel
 The Regent Almaty, Kazakhstan - currently InterContinental Almaty
 The Dorchester - operated 1985–1990, currently part of the Dorchester Collection chain
 The Regent London, UK - currently The Landmark London

Asia
 The Regent Shanghai, China - currently The Longemont Shanghai
 The Regent, Hong Kong - currently InterContinental Hong Kong, to return under the Regent flag in 2022
 The Regent Bali, Indonesia - renamed Fairmont Sanur Beach Bali 2014, then InterContinental Bali Sanur Resort in 2022
 The Regent Chiang Mai, Thailand - opened 1995, currently Four Seasons Resort Chiang Mai
 The Regent Jakarta, Indonesia - opened 1995, renamed Four Seasons Hotel Jakarta 2004, closed 2016, reopened 2022 as The St. Regis Jakarta
 The Regent Mumbai, India - opened 1999, currently Taj Lands End Mumbai
 The Regent Okinawa, Okinawa, Japan - currently The Naha Terrace
 The Regent of Kuala Lumpur, Malaysia - currently Parkroyal Kuala Lumpur
 The Regent Kuala Lumpur, Malaysia - currently Grand Millennium Kuala Lumpur
 The Regent of Manila, Philippines - caught fire in 1985, currently The Heritage Hotel Manila
 Regent Singapore - opened in 1988 as the Pavilion Inter-Continental Singapore, converted to Regent in 1992, left January 1, 2023 to become Conrad Singapore Orchard
 Galle Face Hotel, Colombo, Sri Lanka - currently independent
 Indra Regent Hotel, Bangkok, Thailand - currently independent, though still using the same name
 The Regent of Bangkok, Thailand - later Four Seasons Hotel Bangkok, currently Anantara Siam Bangkok Hotel
 The Regent Phuket Cape Panwa, Thailand - currently Amatara Wellness Resort

Oceania
 The Regent of Melbourne, Australia - currently Sofitel Melbourne on Collins
 The Regent of Sydney, Australia - currently Four Seasons Hotel Sydney
 The Regent of Auckland - formerly Stamford Plaza Auckland in December 2022, reopening as JW Marriott Auckland
 The Regent of Fiji - currently The Westin Denarau Island Resort

Terminated projects
The following property developments were terminated before opening:
 The Regent Bali, Indonesia - opened 1992 as Four Seasons Resort Bali at Jimbaran Bay
 The Regent New York, New York City - opened 1993 as Four Seasons Hotel New York
 The Regent Istanbul, Turkey - opened 1996 as Four Seasons Hotel Istanbul at Sultanahmet
 The Regent Park Hotel, Tokyo Bay - opened 1988 as Dai-ichi Hotel Tokyo Bay, currently Hotel Okura Tokyo Bay
The Regent Yokohama, Japan - opened 1991 as InterContinental Yokohama Grand
The Regent Milan, Italy - opened 1993 as Four Seasons Hotel Milan
 The Regent Mexico City - announced in 1999 with a planned opening in 2000
 The Regent Vancouver - announced in 1999 with a planned opening in 2001
 The Regent Los Cabos - announced in 1999 with a planned opening in 2001
 The Regent Punta Maroma - announced in 1999 with a planned opening in 2001
 The Regent Bangkok, Thailand - planned in 2004, stalled for many years, opened 2018 as Hyatt Regency Bangkok Sukhumvit
 The Regent Boston at Battery Wharf - opened 2009 as Fairmont Battery Wharf, currently Battery Wharf Hotel
 The Regent Kuwait, Kuwait - planned opening 2007, opened 2013 as Jumeirah Messilah Beach Hotel and Spa
 The Regent Doha, Qatar - planned opening 2013, opened 2016 as The Westin Doha Hotel & Spa
 The Regent Abu Dhabi, United Arab Emirates - planned opening 2013, opened 2018 as Grand Hyatt Abu Dhabi Hotel & Residences Emirates Pearl
 The Regent Kuala Lumpur, Malaysia - planned opening 2015, never materialized
 Regent Place Xian, Xi'an, China - planned opening 2017
 Regent Place Harbin, China - planned opening 2017
 The Regent Suzhou, China - planned opening 2018, never materialized
 The Regent Ningbo, China - planned opening 2005, opened 2021 as HUALUXE Ningbo Harbor City
 The Regent Budapest, Hungary - planned opening 2007, opening in 2023 as W Budapest
 The Regent Dubai at Canal Point, United Arab Emirates - planned opening 2010, never materialized
 The Regent Dubrovnik, Croatia - planned opening 2008, never materialized
 The Regent Gurgaon, India - planned opening 2013, never materialized

See also

References

External links 
 

Companies based in Taipei
Hotels established in 1970
Taiwanese brands
Former Carlson (company) subsidiaries
InterContinental Hotels Group brands
1970 establishments in Arizona